"The Hard Way" was the second single from Thirsty Merc's second album Slideshows. It was released on 15 September 2007, charting at a disappointing sixty-three on the Australian Singles Chart. It is maintained, however, that this came about due to high album sales upon the release of Slideshows.

Track listing
The Hard Way (Radio Edit) – 3:57
The Vision (Live) – 6:34
20 Good Reasons (Acoustic) – 3:35

Charts

References

2007 singles
Thirsty Merc songs
Songs written by Rai Thistlethwayte
2006 songs
Warner Music Group singles